

Rogues Point is a locality in the Australian state of  South Australia located on the east coast of Yorke Peninsula immediately adjoining Gulf St Vincent, about  north-west of the Adelaide city centre and about  of the centre of Ardrossan.

Its boundaries were created in May 1999 in respect to the "long established name".

As of 2014, the land use within the locality is divided into the following two zones that are parallel to the coastline: a strip of land zoned as "coastal open space", which is reserved both for community use and as a buffer against sea level rise, and a strip of land zoned as "settlement", which consists of an area of low density residential and associated buildings.

Rogues Point is located within the federal division of Grey, the state electoral district of Narungga and the local government area of the Yorke Peninsula Council.

Windara Reef is  Australia’s largest oyster reef restoration project, and the largest outside of the United States.

See also
List of cities and towns in South Australia

References

Towns in South Australia
Yorke Peninsula